Moscow is a borough in Lackawanna County, Pennsylvania, United States. The population was 2,039 at the 2020 census.

Name

Moscow was settled in the 1830s and is said to be named for the Russian city by early settlers who may have been Russian-German Lutherans.

Geography
Moscow is located at  (41.339274, -75.529053).

Roaring Brook, a tributary of the Lackawanna River and part of the Susquehanna River watershed, flows northward through Moscow, and many tributary streams merge there with the brook.

Demographics

At the 2010 census there were 2,026 people, 751 households, and 569 families residing in the borough. The population density was 723.6 people per square mile (279.4/km²). There were 789 housing units at an average density of 281.8 per square mile (110.1/km²). The racial makeup of the borough was 97.9% White, 0.3% African American, 0.9% Asian, and 0.8% from two or more races. Hispanic or Latino of any race were 1.7%.

There were 751 households, 34.6% had children under the age of 18 living with them, 64% were married couples living together, 7.9% had a female householder with no husband present, and 24.2% were non-families. 21.3% of households were made up of individuals, and 10.4% were one person aged 65 or older. The average household size was 2.7 and the average family size was 3.17.

In the borough the population was spread out, with 25% under the age of 18, 60.7% from 18 to 64, and 14.3% 65 or older. The median age was 40 years.

The median household income was $58,686 and the median family income  was $77,583. Males had a median income of $51,250 versus $37,054 for females. The per capita income for the borough was $32,888. About 6.1% of families and 5.2% of the population were below the poverty line, including 1.1% of those under age 18 and 3.5% of those age 65 or over.

Education
Moscow is serviced by the North Pocono School District. Moscow has five schools within the borough: North Pocono Middle School, North Pocono Intermediate School, Moscow Elementary Center, North Pocono Preschool, and Moscow United Methodist Preschool. Nearby Covington Township contains the site of North Pocono High School, North Pocono Head Start, and the Lackawanna College Environmental Institute. Jefferson Township also contains a North Pocono School District elementary school in Jefferson Elementary School.

Within the school grounds, the school district has athletic facilities including the North Pocono Trojan Stadium at North Pocono Middle School. The complex includes a new  turf football field, new rubber tennis courts, and multiple weight and training rooms. At North Pocono High School is the North Pocono Sports Complex. This includes two grass soccer fields, a softball field, and a baseball field.

Attractions 
Attractions and amenities in the borough include six parks, many youth sports leagues, four churches, the North Pocono Trails Association, and the North Pocono Public Library.

The former Lackawanna Railroad station houses a railroad museum and is currently served by excursion trains from nearby Steamtown National Historic Site.

References

External links

Populated places established in 1830
Boroughs in Lackawanna County, Pennsylvania
1830 establishments in Pennsylvania